Saaliyah (also called: Saaliyah Umar Khan is a village in Samote Union Council of Kallar Syedan Tehsil, Rawalpindi District in the Punjab Province of Pakistan.

Schools in Kaaliyah Saaliyah 
 Government Boys' high school Kahlian Siahlian, Samoot, Kallar Syedan

References

Populated places in Kallar Syedan Tehsil
Villages in Samote union council